The prime minister, literally the minister of state, is the head of government of Monaco, being appointed by and subordinate to the Prince of Monaco. During their term of office, the officeholder is responsible for directing the work of the Monegasque government and is in charge of foreign relations. As the monarch's representative, the prime minister also presides (with voting powers) over the Council of Government, directs the executive services and commands the police and military.

Since 1 September 2020, Pierre Dartout has been the prime minister.

History of the office

The office was created in 1911 with the adoption of Monaco's constitution. Until the revision of the constitution of 2002, the prime minister had to be a French citizen, selected from several senior civil servants proposed by the French government. Since 2002, the prime minister can be either French or Monegasque and is chosen and appointed by the monarch, after consultation with the French government.

List of officeholders

See also
Politics of Monaco
Monarchy of Monaco
List of rulers of Monaco

References

External links
World Statesmen – Monaco

Monaco, Minister of State
Politics of Monaco
Government of Monaco
 
Minister of State
Monaco
1911 establishments in Monaco
Monaco politics-related lists